Jari Pekka Olavi Vilén (born 17 April 1964 in Kemi) is a Finnish diplomat and a politician. Mr. Vilén served in the Finnish Parliament, representing the National Coalition Party and  the district of Lapland from 1999–2007.

Political life
Mr. Vilén served as the Minister of Foreign Trade and European Affairs in Prime Minister Paavo Lipponen's second cabinet in 2002–2003. As Minister for Foreign Trade he was responsible for OECD cooperation, competition and trade policy, consumer affairs and tourism. As Minister for European Affairs he was responsible of the enlargement negotiations of the European Union.

Mr. Vilén was a member of European Convention from 9 May–10 July 2003. Mr Vilén was chosen as Member of the European Union Convention on Future to be the successor for Mr. Matti Vanhanen, sitting Finnish Prime Minister Its purpose was to produce a draft constitution for the European Union.

Mr. Vilén served as a chairman of the Grand Committee of the Parliament of Finland since 18 June 2004 until 21 March 2007. Mr Vilén has become a prominent figure regarding European and international politics in Finland. He writes frequently about wide variety of issues concerning European Union, international, financial and economic policy, education, regional policy as well as defence policy. He has also published and edited writings on the future of European Union.

Mr Vilén has also held numerous confidential posts during his career. Among others he has served as Chairman for the European Movement in Finland (2003–2007), Chairman for the administrative council of the Finnish Fund for Industrial Cooperation Ltd (FINNFUND) (2000–2001, 2003–2007), Chairman for the National Educational Association 2004-, Vice-Chairman for the National Coalition Party Council 1995–2000, Chairman for the Finnish Teacher Student Association 1988–1989, and Chairman for the Conservative Group at the Nordic Council 2001.

During the Mohammed cartoon wars, mr Vilén was the first Finnish politician to condemn the publication of the cartoons in Finland and therefore influencing the Minister of Interiors' decision to initiate the criminal investigations against the organization Suomen Sisu, which published the cartoons on their website.

Foreign service
Mr. Vilén announced on 9 December 2006 that he will not run again in elections because there is a chance that he might be moving to international duties after elections.

The President of Republic Mrs. Tarja Halonen appointed Mr. Vilén to Finland's ambassador in Hungary from 1 August 2007. Mr. Vilén has served as civil servant at Ministry for Foreign Affairs since 1 April 2007.

On 17 February 2012, the president decided to appoint Mr. Vilén as Finland's new ambassador to Warsaw, Poland, effective from 10 September 2012.

In 2014 he was appointed the new EU ambassador to the Council of Europe and took up his functions on 1 September 2014.

From October 2018 to March 2020 ambassador Vilen served as the Senior Advisor in Arctic policy matters in the European Political Strategy Centre (EPSC), the in-house think tank of the European Commission serving President Juncker.

Since March 2020 ambassador Vilén has been serving as Finland's ambassador to Barents and the Northern Dimension in the Ministry of Foreign Affairs.

Education
After finishing his studies and getting the degree of Master of Education from the University of Oulu 1990 Mr. Vilén continued his academic career as researcher in Trinity College and as teacher in St Andrews College, Dublin, Ireland 1990–1991, as assistant in the University of Oulu 1991–1992, and as researcher on a grant from the Academy of Finland in Vrije Universiteit, Brussels, Belgium 1992 - 1994. Following allegations of plagiarism, the University of Oulu published an investigation concerning Mr. Vilén's Master Thesis in 1991. According to the investigation, approximately 50 percent of the text in the thesis is almost identical to other sources without relevant references.

During 2001-2002 After Mr. Vilén's election as a minister University of Oulu reinvestigated after a tip Mr. Vilén's master thesis from 1989 and concluded that part of the thesis were copied from another source without proper notation. Mr. Vilén, his thesis supervisor and Faculty board were all reprimanded. University also stated that there were no legal basis to dissolve the acceptance of the thesis.

Family
Jari Vilén married 2005 Ms. Janina Vilén (née Koski) who at the time of the marriage worked as a parliamentary assistant to Mrs Janina Andersson, A member of Finnish Parliament representing the Green League. Their divorce was announced in 2009. 
Vilén remarried 06.11.2011 in Budapest with Ms. Eva Söregi who is the head of cabinet of the former President of the Hungarian Parliament doctor Katalin Szili. They had a baby boy on December 10, 2017.

Publications 
 Kiitoskortti Hitleriltä - SS-mies Jorma Laitisen päiväkirjat 1941-43, Vilen, Jari (Author), Jokisipilä, Markku (Author), Minerva,

External links
 EU Delegation of the Council of Europe
 Council of Europe 
 Finnish Embassy of Hungary
 Finnish Embassy of Poland
 Finnish Parliament
 Town of Kemi

1964 births
People from Kemi
National Coalition Party politicians
Government ministers of Finland
University of Oulu alumni
Living people
Recipients of the Order of the Cross of Terra Mariana, 3rd Class
Ambassadors of Finland to Hungary
Ambassadors of Finland to Poland